Nahida Esmail is a Tanzanian author and poet. She is a lifetime sponsor of 'The Teen Writers Awards'.

Early life and education 
Nahida Esmail was born and raised in Dar es Salaam, Tanzania. She was educated at Goldsmiths College, University of London, with a BSc in Psychology and completed a Masters in Child Development with Early Childhood Education at the Institute of Education, University of London.

Career 
Esmail has published four young adult fiction novels and ten children's books of which some have been translated into Swahili and Maa.

Writing 
Published books

2011

2014

2017

2019

2021

Poetry
The Atlas Lions

Awards and honours 
In 2015 Esmail was honoured with the Tanzania Women's Achievement Award for the education category.

Her four young adult novels, Living in the Shade, Lesslie the City Maasai, Detectives of Shangani,  and Living in the Shade: Aiming for the Summit have all received CODE's Burt Award for African literature.

References 

Tanzanian women writers
Tanzanian writers
Tanzanian poets
21st-century male writers
Living people
Tanzanian novelists
Tanzanian non-fiction writers
Alumni of Goldsmiths, University of London
Alumni of the UCL Institute of Education
Year of birth missing (living people)